Pardilhó is a village and a civil parish of the municipality of Estarreja, Portugal. The population in 2011 was 4,176, in an area of 	15.7 km2.

References

Freguesias of Estarreja